Tapioca can mean:

Tapioca, a food ingredient
 Tapioca pudding, a food made using tapioca
 The plant from which the food is made, Manihot esculenta
General Tapioca, a fictional character from The Adventures of Tintin